Leushinskaya is a rural locality (a village) and the administrative center of Lipetskoye Rural Settlement, Verkhovazhsky District, Vologda Oblast, Russia. The population was 351 as of 2002. There are 12 streets.

Geography 
Leushinskaya is located 51 km southwest of Verkhovazhye (the district's administrative centre) by road. Gorka is the nearest rural locality.

References 

Rural localities in Verkhovazhsky District